Stephen James Hendry (born 4 December 1990), known professionally as Stephen James, is a British model.

Modelling career
James began modelling after being scouted in Barcelona by an Elite Model Management agent in September 2012. His work includes Calvin Klein, Takeshy Kurosawa, Philipp Plein, Diesel, XTI, GQ Germany, GQ Spain, Adon Magazine, ASOS, Men's Health, El Pais Semanal, Sik Silk and Windsor Smith. His agencies include Elite Model Management (Paris, Barcelona, Copenhagen), Unsigned Group (London), I Love Models (Milan) and Wilhelmina Models (New York, Los Angeles). James' modelling career has been highly successful since late 2012, mostly in Europe, North America, Australia and Japan. He is known for being heavily tattooed and having many body piercings. In 2017, he modelled for Madonna's MDNA skin care range.

Football career

Club 
A Midfielder, Hendry was a member of the youth team at Brentford before his release in 2008. He went into the youth system at non-league club AFC Wimbledon, before making professional appearances with Cypriot First Division club Nea Salamis Famagusta. On 18 July 2010, Super League Greece club Asteras Tripolis named Hendry in their 28 player squad to travel Australia for pre-season preparations, but he failed to win a contract.

International 
In October 2007, Hendry was called up to the Scotland U18 squad for a four-way international tournament in France. He made his international debut when he came on for Michael Graham after 65 minutes of the second match of the competition versus the hosts. He started in the final match against the United States, lasting 71 minutes of the 1–1 draw before being replaced by Craig Connell. He finished his international career with two caps.

Personal life
He is the owner of Elijah, a barbershop and tattoo shop located at Carrer de Trafalgar, 6, 08010 Barcelona, Spain.  He is also due to open a second barbershop in Juan Carlos Fairmont, Barcelona as well as an elite Elijah Gym.  Stephen has recently launched his own unisex grooming range, consisting of shampoo, conditioner, styling products such as clay, paste, volume powder, oil, and even beard oil, all of which are used in his barbershops. 

Stephen is Jewish.

References

External links 
 

AFC Wimbledon players
Brentford F.C. players
Scottish footballers
Footballers from Hammersmith
1990 births
Living people
Anglo-Scots
Nea Salamis Famagusta FC players
Cypriot Second Division players
Scottish expatriate footballers
British expatriates in Cyprus
British male models
Scotland youth international footballers
British Jews
British people of Israeli descent
Association football midfielders